Remorse Code is the sole studio album by English band Desperate Bicycles, released in 1979 by record label. It reached number 10 in the UK Independent Albums chart.

Reception 

Trouser Press called the album "an LP of ten pop gems", while Smash Hits called it "awful. And I do mean awful".

Legacy 

Steven Malkmus cited the album in his list "The Records That Changed My Life" for Spin magazine.

References

External links 

 

1979 albums